Gyraulus convexiusculus is a species of freshwater snail, an aquatic pulmonate gastropod mollusk in the family Planorbidae, the ram's horn snails.

Distribution
Distribution of Gyraulus convexiusculus includes Sistan and Baluchestan Province and Yazd Province in Iran, Afghanistan, Thailand, Nepal, South Korea, Vietnam.

Ecology
Predators of include larvae of Luciola substriata.

Gyraulus convexiusculus is the known first intermediate host of Artyfechinostomum malayanum.

Gyraulus convexiusculus is a potential first and second intermediate host of Echinostoma cinetorchis in Korea, based on laboratory work.

Human use
It is a part of ornamental pet trade for freshwater aquaria.

References

Gyraulus
Gastropods described in 1849